Deansgate is a railway station in Manchester city centre, England,  west of Manchester Piccadilly, close to Castlefield at the junction of Deansgate and Whitworth Street West. It is part of the Manchester station group.

It is linked to Deansgate-Castlefield tram stop and the Manchester Central Convention Complex by a footbridge built in 1985; Deansgate Locks, The Great Northern Warehouse and the Science and Industry Museum  are also nearby.

The platforms are elevated, reached by lift or stairs, or by the walkway from the Manchester Central Complex. The ticket office, staffed full-time, is between street and platform levels. There are no ticket barriers, although manual ticket checks take place on a daily basis.

It is on the Manchester to Preston and the Liverpool to Manchester lines, both heavily used by commuters. Most tickets purchased by passengers to Deansgate are issued to Manchester Stations or Manchester Central Zone, therefore actual usage is not reflected in these statistics, due to the difficulty in splitting the ticket sales correctly between the four grouped stations (Piccadilly, Victoria, Oxford Road and Deansgate).

History
The original station buildings were situated on Hewitt Street. The station was opened as Knot Mill and Deansgate on 20 July 1849 by the Manchester, South Junction and Altrincham Railway (MSJAR) near the Manchester terminus ('the Knot Mill station') of the Bridgewater Canal from which in 1849 travellers could catch a fast packet which could get them to Liverpool in four and a half hours for as little as sixpence. This fare was anomalously low because of a temporary outbreak of competition between the canal and the London and North Western Railway (L&NWR); it was back up to sixteen pence by 1853.
 
When a celebratory train ran over the line at the beginning of July 1849, a reporter for the Manchester Courier observed that most stations had permanent buildings and "at Knott Mill and Oxford-street temporary stations will in the meantime be erected". When the line opened for passenger traffic a fortnight later, the Courier reported the station at Knott Mill had opened with temporary wooden buildings. The booking office was at street level; from it "narrow, steep, troublesome steps, enough to tire anyone but athletes" led to the platforms. The station proved – according to its critics -to be "inconvenient of approach, ugly in appearance, and with platform, booking office, and waiting-room accommodation much cramped" but accessibility was the biggest issue: for the aged, the invalid or children it was "a most difficult not to say dangerous task to climb the steep flights of steps to the platforms."

(The area was also the site of the annual Easter-tide Knott Mill Fair, a decades-old event, which (until its abolition in 1876) hosted acts such as Pablo Fanque's Circus Royal and George Wombwell's Menagerie.

In 1860, special trains laid on in connection with the fair by both the L&NWR and the Manchester, Sheffield and Lincolnshire Railway (MS&LR), the joint owners of the MSJAR were not advertised as running to Knott Mill station; the LNWR excursion ran to Ordsall Lane, the MS&L excursion to London Road (now Piccadilly station).)

If the station was originally named "Knot Mill and Deansgate" by the MSJAR, from its opening onwards it was simply 'Knott Mill' (or 'Knot Mill') to the Manchester papers and by 1860 the railway was following suit in its advertisements. In 1864, the MS&LR gave the required notice of a bill to be brought forward in the next session of Parliament for widening part of the MSJAR "from or near Knott Mill Station to Old Trafford Station"; however in the same year the accident return for an accident at Old Trafford noted that the train involved had stopped at "Knot Mill, and left that station..."

Following the widening and improvement of the southern portion of Deansgate, in 1880 a correspondent to the Manchester Courier suggested that the station be renamed Deansgate "Very few lady passengers who have shopping to do in Deansgate make use of the Knot Mill Station. If they are aware of its nearness, perhaps they are waiting for the station and its approaches to be improved" A public meeting in October 1884 complained that Knott Mill station was altogether inadequate for the newly improved district; the MSJAR was therefore in breach of its Act of Parliament which required it to provide sufficient station accommodation: the Improvement Committee of Manchester Corporation was called upon to exert pressure on the MSJAR. A deputation from the Improvement Committee duly met directors of the railway to urge them to improve the "dingy" and "long-neglected" station. Improvement plans were drawn up but an impasse was reached; the MSJAR's joint owners (the L&NWR and the MS&LR) disagreed on how much they should spend on improvement and Manchester Corporation were unhappy with any narrowing of adjacent streets to accommodate an enlarged station. Not until 1892 was a plan devised that was acceptable to all of the interested parties. Negotiations to purchase the required land were protracted, with Manchester Corporation eventually offering to exercise its powers of compulsory purchase to assist the railway, but the work finally went out for tender in January 1895. Work started in March 1895 (by June 1895 a temporary entrance from Gaythorn Street had to be used and the previous entrance from Deansgate closed); it was completed in September 1896; the latter year appears (in a shield) as part of the decorative stonework over the entrance. The station name is given there as simply "Knott Mill Station". The station is now a Grade II listed building. Its battlemented architectural feature, visible at its corner, is intended to mirror similar features in the nearby viaducts, all of which in turn incorporated the design in recognition of the Roman fort that once stood in the Castlefield area.

The station became Knott Mill and Deansgate (for railway purposes: to the local press it remained Knott Mill station) around 1900 and Deansgate on 3 May 1971. It is sometimes known as Manchester Deansgate, and on many station information boards it is Deansgate G-Mex.

(The station name Deansgate was formerly used for the Great Northern Railway goods station serving the Great Northern Warehouse next to Manchester Central railway station. This is now a Grade II* listed (as  Deansgate Goods Station) building.
)

Services

All services at this station are operated by Northern. As of December 2022, the typical off-peak service pattern is:
 11tpd continuing to 
 4tpd continuing to 
 2tph to 
 1tph to  via 
 1tph to  via 
 1tph to  via 
 2tph to 
 4tph to 

Metrolink

See also

Listed buildings in Manchester-M3

Notes

Further reading

External links

Railway stations in Manchester
DfT Category D stations
Former Manchester, South Junction and Altrincham Railway stations
Railway stations in Great Britain opened in 1849
Northern franchise railway stations
1849 establishments in England